Alexander R. Galloway (born 1974) is an author and professor in the Department of Media, Culture, and Communication at New York University. He has a bachelor's degree in Modern Culture and Media from Brown University and earned a Ph.D. in Literature from Duke University in 2001. Galloway is known for his writings on philosophy, media theory, contemporary art, film, and video games.

Work 
Galloway's first book, Protocol: How Control Exists After Decentralization, is a study of information networks and their political and computational effects. It identifies protocols like TCP/IP and HTTP as means of control that govern people's interactions with the Internet. His other published writings examine film noir, video games, software art, hacktivism, and digital aesthetics. Galloway has conducted several seminars through The Public School NYC, including "French Theory Today", and translated the work of philosopher François Laruelle and the Tiqqun collective.

Galloway is also a programmer and artist. He is a founding member of the Radical Software Group (RSG), and his art projects include Carnivore (awarded a Golden Nica at Ars Electronica 2002), and Kriegspiel (based on a war game originally designed by Guy Debord). Galloway was an Eyebeam Honorary Resident and later became a member of their Advisory Council.

In 2013 Galloway, along with Eugene Thacker and McKenzie Wark, published the book Excommunication: Three Inquiries in Media and Mediation. In the opening of the book the authors ask, "Does everything that exists, exist to be presented and represented, to be mediated and remediated, to be communicated and translated? There are mediative situations in which heresy, exile, or banishment carry the day, not repetition, communion, or integration. There are certain kinds of messages that state 'there will be no more messages'. Hence for every communication there is a correlative excommunication." This approach has been referred to as the "New York School of Media Theory".

Bibliography 
 Protocol: How Control Exists After Decentralization, MIT Press, 2004. 
 Gaming: Essays on Algorithmic Culture, University of Minnesota Press, 2006. 
 The Exploit: A Theory of Networks, coauthored with Eugene Thacker. University of Minnesota Press, 2007. 
 French Theory Today — An Introduction to Possible Futures, The Public School New York, 2010.  (translated into French by Clémentine Duzer and Thomas Duzer as Les Nouveaux Réalistes - Philosophie et Postfordisme, Editions Léo Scheer, 2012)
 The Interface Effect, Polity Books, 2012. 
 Dark Nights of the Universe (with Eugene Thacker, Daniel Coluciello Barber, and Nicola Masciandaro) ([NAME] Publications, 2013). 
 Excommunication: Three Inquiries in Media and Mediation (with Eugene Thacker and McKenzie Wark) (University of Chicago Press, 2013). 
 Laruelle: Against the Digital (University of Minnesota Press, 2014). 
 Uncomputable: Play and Politics in the Long Digital Age, Verso, 2021

See also 
 François Laruelle
 Alain Badiou
 Gilles Deleuze
 Martin Heidegger
 McKenzie Wark
 Jussi Parikka
 Eugene Thacker
 Software art
 Internet art

References

External links 
 Alex Galloway site
 NYU: Alex Galloway
 Rhizome: Alex Galloway
 Radical Software Group (includes links to Carnivore and Kriegspiel projects)
 Michael Samyn interviewed by Alex Galloway
 Switch Interview (2004)
 Sovereignty and the State of Emergency (with Eugene Thacker, 2005)
 Warcraft and Utopia , Ctheory (16 February 2006)
 What Can A Network Do? podcast, 2009
 Black Box, Black Bloc podcast (2010)
 Debord's Nostalgic Algorithm, Culture Machine no. 10 (2009)
 Whatever Future - Idiom Magazine Interview (25 October 2010) 
 Leper Creativity, panel discussion with Nicola Masciandaro and Eugene Thacker, The New School, March 2011
 Deleuze and Computers podcast (2011)
 Dark Nights of the Universe, The Public School NYC/Recess Gallery, April 26–29, 2012 (with Eugene Thacker, Daniel Coluciello Barber, and Nicola Masciandaro)
 A Response to Graham Harman's Marginalia on Radical Thinking An und für sich (3 June 2012)
 Laruelle and Art, continent 2.4 (2012)
 The Poverty of Philosophy, Critical Inquiry 39.2 (Winter 2013)
 The Black Box of Philosophy: Compression and Obfuscation, "Incredible Machines" conference, Vancouver BC, 7 March 2014
 Excommunication - Mediating the Nonhuman, with Eugene Thacker and McKenzie Wark, NYU, 16 April 2014
 Speculative Futures - podcast discussion with Galloway and Steven Shaviro, moderated by Eugene Thacker from November 2014.

Living people
American conceptual artists
Brown University alumni
Duke University alumni
New York University faculty
1974 births
Philosophers of technology